Meng Anming (born July 22, 1963 in Dazhu, Sichuan) is a Chinese developmental biologist. In 1983 he graduated from Southwest Agricultural University (now part of Southwest University), and in November 1990 he received his PhD from the Genetics Department of the University of Nottingham. From 1990 to 1998 he served as an associate professor of Beijing Agricultural University, and from 1998 a professor of Tsinghua University. In 2007 he was elected a member of Chinese Academy of Sciences, and in 2008 a member of TWAS. In 2001 he was awarded the Ho Leung Ho Lee Foundation Prize for Scientific and Technologic Progress.

Meng's research mainly focuses on the molecular mechanism of early vertebrate embryonic development. He uses zebrafish to study zygote genome activation, mesoderm induction and pattern formation in development of vertebrate embryos, and discovered the role of several specific genes in mesoderm induction and dorsoventral patterning. And he first developed a method to study gene expression regulatory elements in living embryos of zebrafish using GFP transgenic technology. In the 1990s he studied genetic variability using DNA profiling.

He is the Board Chairman of the China Zebrafish Resource Center.

References

External links
Meng Anming, School of Life Sciences Tsinghua University

1963 births
Living people
Alumni of the University of Nottingham
Biologists from Sichuan
Academic staff of China Agricultural University
Educators from Sichuan
Members of the Chinese Academy of Sciences
People from Dazhu County
Southwest University alumni
Academic staff of Tsinghua University